Arawacus aethesa is a species of butterfly in the family Lycaenidae. It is endemic to Brazil.

References

Arawacus
Fauna of Brazil
Endemic fauna of Brazil
Lycaenidae of South America
Taxonomy articles created by Polbot
Butterflies described in 1851
Taxa named by William Chapman Hewitson